Ulrich Papke (born 4 May 1962) is an East German-German sprint canoeist who competed from the early 1980s to the mid-1990s. He won two medals at the 1992 Summer Olympics in Barcelona with a gold in the C-2 1000 m event and a silver in the C-2 500 m event.

Papke had better success at the ICF Canoe Sprint World Championships where he won eleven medals. This included three golds (C-1 1000 m: 1981, C-2 1000: 1990, 1991), three silvers (C-1 500 m: 1983, C-2 500 m: 1990, C-4 1000 m: 1991), and five bronzes (C-2 500 m: 1985, 1986; C-2 1000 m: 1987, 1993; C-4 1000 m: 1995).

References

External links

1962 births
Canoeists at the 1992 Summer Olympics
German male canoeists
Living people
Olympic canoeists of Germany
Olympic gold medalists for Germany
Olympic silver medalists for Germany
Olympic medalists in canoeing
ICF Canoe Sprint World Championships medalists in Canadian

Medalists at the 1992 Summer Olympics